The 2019 SAFF U-15 Championship was 6th the edition of the SAFF U-15 Championship, an international football competition for men's under-15 national teams organized by South Asian Football Federation (SAFF). The tournament was hosted by India at Kalyani Stadium from August 21 to August 31, 2019. Five teams from the region were took part in the tournament.

Bangladesh is the defending champion. They have won previous season title by beating Pakistan 1(3)−1(2) penalties shoot out on 3 November 2018.

Squads
Players born on or after 1 January 2004 are eligible to compete in the tournament. Each team have to register a squad of minimum 18 players and maximum 23 players, minimum three of whom had to be goalkeepers.

Participating teams
Pakistan had sent their entry for the meet. However, due to some internal problems in their federation , they have withdrawn.
A letter to reconfirm their entry was sent by SAFF, Pakistan said they would not be able to participate.

Officials

Referees
 Bhubon Tarafder (Bangladesh) 
 Nabindra Maharjan (Nepal) 
 Ugyen Penjor (Bhutan) 
 Sanjaya Chathuranga (Sri Lanka) 
 Vinay Suvarna (India) 

Assistant Referees
 Khorshed Alam (Bangladesh) 
 Madhav Khatri (Nepal) 
 Pema Pema (Bhutan) 
 Riyazy Salam (Sri Lanka) 
 Ujjal Halder (India)

Venues

Round Robin
All the five teams will play each other in a round robin phase and the top two teams will play the final.

All matches are played in Kalyani, India.
Times listed are UTC+05:30.

</onlyinclude>

Final

Winner

Goalscorers

Broadcasting rights

References

2019
2019 in Asian football
2019
2019–20 in Nepalese football
2019–20 in Indian football
2019 in Bhutanese football
2019 in Bangladeshi football
2019 in Maldivian football
2019–20 in Pakistani football
2019–20 in Sri Lankan football
2019 in youth association football
August 2019 sports events in India